Matteo Belfrond (born 15 December 1967) is a retired Italian alpine skier.

World Cup results
Belfrond boasts two podiums in the World Cup.
Podium

References

External links
 

1967 births
Living people
Italian male alpine skiers